Amit Ali (born 26 October 2002) is an Indian cricketer. He made his List A debut on 24 February 2021, for Tripura in the 2020–21 Vijay Hazare Trophy. He made his Twenty20 debut on 4 November 2021, for Tripura in the 2021–22 Syed Mushtaq Ali Trophy. He made his first-class debut on 24 February 2022, for Tripura in the 2021–22 Ranji Trophy.

References

External links
 

2002 births
Living people
Indian cricketers
Tripura cricketers